Meppayur is a town in Kozhikode district of Kerala state, South India.

Villages and desoms
There are two villages, Meppayur and Kozhukkallur. Meppayur Panchayath was formed in 1963.

Desams include Meppayur, Keezhpayur, Changaravelly, Kayalad, Narakkode,  Nidumpoyil, Chavatta, Kozhukkallur, and Vilayattur

Demographics

As of the 2011 India census Meppayur panchayath had a population of 12914 males and 13833 females, for a total of 26747, in 5531 households.

Politics
Meppayur is one of the noted cultural and political areas in Malabar. Earlier, Meppayur assembly constituency was part of Vatakara (Lok Sabha constituency). At the time of delimitation Meppayur LAC, was renamed as Kuttiady LAC. Mepapyur and Cheruvannur panchayaths were added to Perambra LAC.

Location
Meppayur area is situated between kottappuzha (Kuttiadippuzha) and Nelliadipuzha. Meppayur town is about 11 km away from NH 17 and 12 km away from Koyilandy Railway station.

Educational institutions

 Govt. Vocational Higher Secondary School, Meppayur
 Vilayatoor Elampiladu Mappila U.P. School
 Meppayur ALP School
 Darul Huda English medium School-Manhakulam (Unaided)
 Keezhpayur AUP School, Keezhpayur, Meppayur
Kizhppayur West L.P School, Kizhppayur
K.G.M.S U.P SCHOOL KOZHUKKALLUR

Colleges and post-matriculation institutions 
 Salafi Educational Institutions-Headquarters
 Salafi TTI
 Salafi Private ITI (ITC)
 Salafi Arabic College
 Udaya College (Open Edn, Tution Centre)
 Viswabharathi College (Tution Centre)
 sirajul huda manjakkulam
 majmau meppayyoor

Places of Interest
Bus Stand (Private Bus Station)
Public Health Centre, Meppayur (Govt. Hospital)
Relief Clinic (Dr.Muhammad)
Meppayur Police Station
State Bank of India, Meppayur
Post Office, Meppayur
Federal Bank, Meppayur
KDC Bank, Meppayur (co-operative)
KSEB Section Office
BSNL Office
Nearest temple: Mangattummel Sree Paradevada  (in town)
Temple: Kalaangot Sree Kurumba Bhagavathy Mandapam Kshetram, Kalaangot Tharawad.
Temple: Meppayur Sree Durga Bhagavathy Kshethram (Formerly known as Sree Pishariyakal Durga Kshethram)
Temple: Sree Puthiyedath Paradevatha Kshethram
 Temple:  Sree Edathil Paradevatha Temple (archeological possibilities)
 Temple:  Koonam Velli kavue Sree Paradevada Temple
 Temple:  Sree Thiruvangayoor Sivaksethram
 Temple:  Sree Kozhukkallur Sivaksethram
 Temple:  Sreekandamanasala Temple
 Temple:  Sree Ravattamangalam Mahavishnuksethram
 Temple:  Ambalakulangara Kariyathan Temple vilayattoor Moottaparamb), 4 km
 Temple:  Sree Kupperikavu Temple(4 km)
 Temple:  Sree Edakkayil Temple
 Temple:  Thevarkandi Mahavishnu Temple Manjakkulam Narakkode, 3 km
 Nearest Masjid:  Meppayur Town Juma Masjid

Important places
 Manjakkulam industrial area 
 Microwave Repeating Station 
  110 KV Sub Station Meppayur
  Petrol bunks: Manjakulam (1.5 km away from town); Near old post office/Wood Mill (east side of the town)
  ATMs : SBI, Federal Bank, KGB, all in the west side of the town (near post office & Govt. Hospital) Canara Bank ATM at nelliady road, KDC Bank ATM at perambra road.

Nearest towns
 Perambra  (8 km)
 Payyoli   (11 km)
 Koyilandy (12 km)
 Kuttiady  (20 km)
 Kozhikode (38 km)- City

Transportation
Meppayur village connects to other parts of India through Koyilandy town.  The nearest airports are at Kannur and Kozhikode.  The nearest railway station is at Koyilandy.  The national highway No.66 passes through Koyilandy and the northern stretch connects to Mangalore, Goa and Mumbai.  The southern stretch connects to Cochin and Trivandrum.  The eastern National Highway No.54 going through Kuttiady connects to Mananthavady, Mysore and Bangalore.

References

Koyilandy area